Pimelea congesta is a species of flowering plant in the family Thymelaeaceae and is endemic to Lord Howe Island in Australia. It is a shrub with rough bark, decussate, elliptic leaves and heads of white flowers.

Description
The leaves are leathery, dull pale green, and glabrous. The flowers are white and borne in heads of about 9 flowers on the ends of branchlets.

Taxonomy
Pimelea congesta was first formally described in 1872 by Charles Moore and Ferdinand von Mueller in Fragmenta Phytographiae Australiae from specimens collected by Moore on "the top of Mount Lidgbird and in other places on Lord Howe's Island". The specific epithet (congesta) refers to the congested inflorescence.

Distribution and habitat
The species is endemic to Lord Howe Island where it is widespread, especially on exposed ridges. It is closely related to Pimelea longifolia of New Zealand.

References

congesta
Endemic flora of Lord Howe Island
Plants described in 1872
Malvales of Australia
Taxa named by Ferdinand von Mueller
Taxa named by Charles Moore